George Francis Mitchell,  (15 October 1912 – 25 November 1997) was an Irish geologist and naturalist. He was generally known as Frank Mitchell.

Career
He was born in Dublin, the son of David William Mitchell, a merchant, and his wife Frances Elizabeth Kirkby. He was educated at the High School in Dublin then studied Natural Sciences at Trinity College, Dublin, where he graduated BA. He was later awarded M.Sc (1935) and M.A. (1937).

He became Assistant to the Professor of Geology, Knud Jessen, in 1934 and under his guidance carried out field studies of post-glacial sediments in Ireland. His lifetime interest, however, was in integrating the various disciplines in the study of the Irish natural environment and he developed interests in fields such as botany and archaeology. He bought Townley Hall from Trinity College and turned it into a study centre, which he personally funded and which enabled research in several different disciplines, particularly archaeological investigations at Knowth.

He was elected a Fellow of Trinity College in 1944, followed by a readership in Irish Archaeology and then appointed to the Chair of Quaternary Studies in 1965.

Honours and awards

He was elected a Fellow of the Royal Society in 1973.

He was awarded the Boyle Medal of the Royal Dublin Society in 1978 and the Cunningham Medal of the Royal Irish Academy in 1989. He was President of the Royal Irish Academy for 1976–79, of the Royal Society of Antiquaries of Ireland for 1957–60, of An Taisce for 1991–93 and of the International Quaternary Association for 1969–73.

References

1912 births
1997 deaths
Scientists from Dublin (city)
Alumni of Trinity College Dublin
Fellows of the Royal Society
20th-century Irish historians
People associated with Trinity College Dublin
Presidents of the Royal Irish Academy